Hallock Homestead is a historic farm complex located at Northville in Suffolk County, New York. The farmstead includes five contributing buildings: the main house, barn, milk house, shop / wood house, and privy.  The farmhouse was originally built in 1765 as a one-story, five bay structure with a central chimney.  In 1833, a small room was added to the west side and in 1845, the original dwelling was raised to two stories and capped with a broad gable roof.

It was added to the National Register of Historic Places in 1984.

See also
Hallock State Park Preserve

References

External links
Hallockville Museum Farm - official site

Houses on the National Register of Historic Places in New York (state)
Houses completed in 1765
Open-air museums in New York (state)
Museums in Suffolk County, New York
Houses in Suffolk County, New York
Agriculture museums in the United States
National Register of Historic Places in Suffolk County, New York